Siemtje Möller (born 20 July 1983) is a German teacher and politician of the Social Democratic Party (SPD) who has been serving as a member of the Bundestag from the state of Lower Saxony since the 2017 elections.

In addition to her parliamentary work, Möller has been serving as Parliamentary State Secretary in the  Federal Ministry of Defence in the coalition government of Chancellor Olaf Scholz since 2021.

Political career 
Möller became member of the Bundestag in the 2017 German federal election, representing the Friesland – Wilhelmshaven – Wittmund district. She served on the Defense Committee from 2018 until 2021, where she was her parliamentary group's spokesperson from 2020 until 2021. In addition to her committee assignments, she co-chairs the German-Ukrainian Parliamentary Friendship Group.

Within her parliamentary group, Möller served as one of the three speakers of the Seeheim Circle (alongside Dirk Wiese and Dagmar Ziegler) from 2020 to 2022; she succeeded Johannes Kahrs in that position and was in turn followed by Marja-Liisa Völlers.

In the negotiations to form a so-called traffic light coalition of the SPD, the Green Party and the Free Democratic Party (FDP) following the 2021 federal elections, Möller was part of her party's delegation in the working group on foreign policy, defence, development cooperation and human rights, co-chaired by Heiko Maas, Omid Nouripour and Alexander Graf Lambsdorff.

Other activities
 Centre for International Peace Operations (ZIF), Ex-Officio Member of the Supervisory Board (since 2022)
 German Foundation for Peace Research (DSF), Member of the Board (since 2022)
 Federal Foundation for the Reappraisal of the SED Dictatorship, Member of the Board of Trustees (since 2022)
 German Institute for International and Security Affairs (SWP), Member of the Council (since 2022)
 Business Forum of the Social Democratic Party of Germany, Member of the Political Advisory Board (since 2020)
 Deutsche Maritime Akademie, Member of the Advisory Board 
 Education and Science Workers' Union (GEW), Member
 IG Metall, Member

References

External links 

  
 Bundestag biography 

1983 births
Living people
Members of the Bundestag for Lower Saxony
Female members of the Bundestag
21st-century German women politicians
Members of the Bundestag 2021–2025
Members of the Bundestag 2017–2021
Members of the Bundestag for the Social Democratic Party of Germany